In linear algebra, the modal matrix is used in the diagonalization process involving eigenvalues and eigenvectors.

It is utilized in the similarity transformation

 

Example 
The matrix

has eigenvalues and corresponding eigenvectors

One possible choice for an invertible matrix  such that  is

Generalized modal matrix 
Let  be an n × n matrix.

One can show that

where  is a matrix in Jordan normal form.

Note that when computing these matrices, equation is the easiest of the two equations to verify, since it does not require inverting a matrix.

Example 
This example illustrates a generalized modal matrix with four Jordan chains.  Unfortunately, it is a little difficult to construct an interesting example of low order.
The matrix

has a single eigenvalue  with algebraic multiplicity .  A canonical basis for  will consist of one linearly independent generalized eigenvector of rank 3 (generalized eigenvector rank; see generalized eigenvector), two of rank 2 and four of rank 1; or equivalently, one chain of three vectors , one chain of two vectors , and two chains of one vector , .

Notes

References 
 
 
 

Matrices